BitTorrent is a peer-to-peer (P2P) communications protocol for file sharing. It may also refer to:

 Rainberry, Inc., a company which develops and maintains the BitTorrent protocol, formerly known as BitTorrent, Inc.
 BitTorrent (software), the original BitTorrent client
 BitTorrent DNA (Delivery Network Accelerator)

See also 
 Glossary of BitTorrent terms
 Comparison of BitTorrent clients, programs that download files using the BitTorrent protocol
 Comparison of BitTorrent tracker software, server programs that serve as peer rendezvous points (sometimes also web site software that hosts Torrent files)
 Comparison of BitTorrent sites, sites which index torrent files
 Torrent file, stores metadata used for BitTorrent